The 37th Durban International Film Festival took place from the 16th to 26th of June 2016. The festival included 150 screenings of feature films, documentaries and short films in 15 different venues in Durban. The Festiveal was opened with the world premiere of The Journeymen which took place in The Playhouse. Part of the 37th DIFF was the 11th Wavescape Film Festival, which showed 21 films with a focus on outdoor activities.

Competition

The following feature films were selected for the competition: 

The following documentaries were selected for the competition:

Awards

The following prizes were awarded:

 Best Feature Film - The Violin Player
 Best South African Feature Film - Tess
 Best Direction -  Ciro Guerra for Embrace Of The Serpent
 Best Cinematography - Chris Lotz for The Endless River 
 Best Screenplay - Ciro Guerra and Thoedor Koch-Grunberg for Embrace of The Serpent
 Best Actor - Mohsen Namjoo for his performance in Radio Dream
 Best Actress - Christia Visser for her role as Tess
 Best Editing - Linda Man for Tess
 Artistic Bravery -  Neon Bull by Gabriel Mascaro
 Best Documentary - Martha & Niki
 Best South African Documentary - The Journeymen
 Best Short Film - Grandma's Day (Dzie'n Babci) by Milosz Sakowski
 Best African Short Film - New Eyes by Hiwot Admasu
 Best South African Short Film - eKhaya (Home) by Shubham Mehta
 Audience Choice Award - Nakom by Kelly Daniela Norris and T.W. Pittman
 Amnesty International Durban Human Rights Award - Noma by Pablo Pinedo Boveda

References

External links
 Durban International Film Festival site (English).

Film festivals in South Africa
Festivals in Durban